The National Geodetic Vertical Datum of 1929 is the official name since 1973 of the vertical datum established for vertical control surveying in the United States of America by the General Adjustment of 1929.  Originally known as Sea Level Datum of 1929, NGVD 29 was determined and published by the National Geodetic Survey and used to measure the elevation of a point above and depression below mean sea level (MSL).

NGVD29 was superseded by the North American Vertical Datum of 1988 (NAVD 88), based upon reference to a single benchmark (referenced to the new International Great Lakes Datum of 1985 local mean sea level height value), although many cities and U.S. Army Corps of Engineers "legacy" projects with established data continued to use the older datum.

Methodology
Mean sea level was measured at 26 tide gauges: 21 in the United States and 5 in Canada.  The datum was defined by the observed heights of mean sea level at the 26 tide gauges and by the set of elevations of all bench marks resulting from the adjustment of observations.  The adjustment required a total of 66,315 miles (106,724 km) of levelling with 246 closed circuits and 25 circuits at sea level.

Since the Sea Level Datum of 1929 was a hybrid model, it was not a pure model of mean sea level, the geoid, or any other equipotential surface.  Therefore, it was renamed the National Geodetic Vertical Datum of 1929 (NGVD 29) by the National Geodetic Survey (then, and since, under the auspices of NOAA) May 10, 1973.

See also 
 Altitude
 Elevation
 Geodetic datum
 Geodesy
 Geoid
 Mean sea level
 North American Vertical Datum of 1988
 Reference ellipsoid
 Topography

References

External links 
 
 
 
 

1929 in the United States
Topography
Surveying of the United States
Vertical datums